Olgierd Łukaszewicz (born 7 September 1946) is a Polish film actor. He has appeared in more than 60 films since his 1969 graduation from the Ludwik Solski Academy for the Dramatic Arts in Kraków. Between 2002 and 2005, he was the President of the Polish Union of Stage Actors (Związek Artystów Scen Polskich).

Selected filmography
 1970: Salt of the Black Earth (Sól ziemi czarnej) as Gabriel Basista
 1972: Pearl in the Crown (Perła w koronie) as Jaś
 1972: The Wedding (Wesele) as Phantom
 1977: The Story of Sin (Dzieje grzechu) as Zygmunt Szczerbic
 1975: Nights and Days (Noce i dnie) as Janusz Ostrzeński
 1978: Jörg Ratgeb – Painter as Bishop
 1981: Fever (Gorączka: Dzieje jednego pocisku) as Marek
 1982: Interrogation (Przesłuchanie) as Konstnty
 1984: Sexmission (Seksmisja) as Albert Starski
 1986: Boris Godunov as Mikolaj Czernikowski
 1987: Magnat as Franzel 
 1987: Kingsajz as Paragraph
 1988: A Short Film About Killing (Krótki film o zabijaniu) as Andrzej
 1988: Decalogue II & Decalogue V as Andrzej Geller
 1994: Johnnie Waterman as Old man
 2000: Keep Away from the Window (Daleko od okna) as Regina's emissary
 2001: The Hexer (Wiedźmin) as Stregobor
 2005: Karol: A Man Who Became Pope (Karol, un uomo diventato papa) as Karol Wojtyła’s father
 2009: Generał Nil as General Emil “Nil” Fieldorf
 2009: Było sobie miasteczko...

As voice actor:
 1995: Rob Roy as Rob Roy MacGregor
 1998: Rudolph the Red-Nosed Reindeer: The Movie
 1999: Inspector Gadget as Sanford “Claw” Scolex
 2000: The Adventures of Rocky and Bullwinkle as President Signoff
 2005: Have No Fear: The Life of Pope John Paul II as Karol Wojtyła
 2005: Pope John Paul II as Cardinal Adam Sapieha
 2009: Copernicus' Star
 2012: Frankenweenie as Mr. Rzykruski

Selected medals
 Order of Polonia Restituta
 Cross of Merit (Poland)
 Officer's Cross of the Order of Merit of the Federal Republic of Germany

External links

1946 births
Living people
People from Chorzów
Polish male film actors
Polish twins
Officers Crosses of the Order of Merit of the Federal Republic of Germany
Polish male voice actors
Knights of the Order of Polonia Restituta
Officers of the Order of Polonia Restituta
Recipients of the Silver Cross of Merit (Poland)
Recipients of the Silver Medal for Merit to Culture – Gloria Artis
Polish male stage actors
Recipient of the Meritorious Activist of Culture badge